This is an incomplete list of Filipino full-length films, both mainstream and independently produced, released in theaters and cinemas in 2010.

Films

Awarding ceremonies

See also
 2010 in the Philippines
 List of 2010 box office number-one films in the Philippines

References

Phil
2010 in the Philippines